Details of annual passenger earnings from some of the railway stations in Kerala state of India.

Top 15 revenue-generating stations in Kerala

Financial year 2018–19

Financial year 2016–17

**Note:-
Stations with blue background - District headquarters stations or satellite stations of major terminal railway stations.
Stations written in bold letters - Stations generating Rs. 2,00,00,000(Rs. 2 Crore) or more in a financial year.

Financial year 2011–12 & 2012–13

**Note:-
Stations with blue background - District headquarters stations or satellite stations of major terminal railway stations.
Stations written in bold letters - Stations generating Rs. 1,00,00,000(Rs. 1 Crore) or more in a financial year.

Notes

References

External links

Thiruvananthapuram railway division
Rail transport in Kerala